The Kettle River is a  tributary of the Columbia River, encompassing a  drainage basin, of which  are in southern British Columbia, Canada and  in northeastern Washington, US.

Name
The indigenous name of the river in the Okanagan language is nxʷyaʔłpítkʷ (Ne-hoi-al-pit-kwu.) Although British officials used this name, Kettle River was in popular use by 1860. The most likely name origin is from the Kettle Falls, which early explorers called "La Chaudiére" ("The Boiler"), because of the effervescent water. A possible alternative is the round holes, shaped like cauldrons, which water had hollowed out in the rocks.

Course
From its source at the outlet of Holmes Lake in the Monashee Mountains of British Columbia, the Kettle River flows south to Midway, British Columbia. Along the way it is joined by many tributaries, most notably the West Kettle River. Below Midway, the river loops south, crossing the Canada–US border into the United States, through Ferry County, Washington, before flowing north back into Canada, passing by Grand Forks, British Columbia, where the Granby River joins. It then flows south, forming part of the Ferry-Stevens County line, before joining the Columbia River near Kettle Falls, Washington. The Columbia River at this point is a large reservoir impounded behind Grand Coulee Dam, called Lake Roosevelt. The Kettle enters the lake at the Columbia's river mile 706. The Kettle River is undammed, making it one of the few rivers with constant flow in the Pacific Northwest.

Natural history

The Kettle River once supported salmon and other anadromous fish. The construction of Grand Coulee Dam, along with Chief Joseph Dam, blocked fish migration up the Columbia and its upper tributaries, including the Kettle River. In addition, Grand Coulee Dam's reservoir, Lake Roosevelt, flooded traditional fishery sites, including Kettle Falls near the mouth of the Kettle River.

See also

 Tributaries of the Columbia River
 List of British Columbia rivers
 List of rivers in Washington
 Kettle River Range

References

Boundary Country
Rivers of Ferry County, Washington
Monashee Mountains
Rivers of British Columbia
Rivers of Washington (state)
Rivers of Stevens County, Washington
Tributaries of the Columbia River
International rivers of North America